Live Forever is the first full length live album by Australian band The Screaming Jets. The album was recorded at The Club Nova, Newcastle, Australia on 9 June 2001. It was self-released in December 2002.

Track listing

Disc one
"Dream On"
"Alright"
"Tunnel"
"Blue Sashes"
"Realise"
"No Point"
"Starting Out"
"Higher With You"
"Shine Over Me"
"Helping Hand"
"Watching the Grass Grow"
"October Grey"
"Sad Song"
"Think"
"Here I Go"

Disc two
"Needle"
"Individuality"
"No Way Out"
"I Need Your Love"
"Too Drunk to Fuck"
"C'mon"
"Shine On"
"Shivers"
"Living in England"
"Better"
"Friend of Mine"
"F.R.C"

References

The Screaming Jets albums
2002 live albums
Self-released albums